Noel Fitzgerald McGrath was an Irish rugby union international who played once for Ireland during the 1933/34 season.

He was the eldest son of Sir Charles McGrath of Stanley Grange, Wakefield RFC and was educated at Stonyhurst College, Leeds University and Oxford University where he gained a blue.

He played his club rugby for Wakefield, Headingley and London Irish and played 16 times for Yorkshire.

He made his only international appearance for Ireland in their 13-0 defeat to Wales at Swansea on 10 March 1934.

The Wakefield Express described him "Strong, dashing player who goes in search of work and never appears to tire"

References 

Irish rugby union players
Ireland international rugby union players
Wakefield RFC players
People educated at Stonyhurst College
1974 deaths
1909 births
Rugby union players from Wakefield
Rugby union props